Thankful is the fourth studio album by Nigerian singer Flavour N'abania. It was released on 14 November 2014 by 2nite Entertainment.

Track listing

Personnel
Chidinma - Featured artist
Wande Coal - Featured artist
Phyno - Featured artist
Waga G - Featured artist
Onyii- Featured artist
Selebobo - Featured artist 
Oloye - Featured artist
Jerry Cee- Featured artist 
Whad Up - Featured artist

References

2014 albums
Flavour N'abania albums
Igbo-language albums
Albums produced by Masterkraft (producer)
Albums produced by Del B
Albums produced by Selebobo